Castela is a genus of thorny shrubs and small trees in the family Simaroubaceae. Members of the genus are native to the Americas, especially the tropical regions. The generic name honours the French naturalist René Richard Louis Castel. Castela is dioecious, with male and female flowers on separate plants.

Species
There are 17 accepted species:
Castela calcicola (Britton & Small) Ekman ex Urb.
Castela coccinea Griseb.
Castela depressa Turpin
Castela emoryi (A.Gray) Moran & Felger – Crucifixion thorn
Castela erecta Turp. – Goatbush
Castela galapageia – Bitterbush
Castela jacquiniifolia (Small) Ekman ex Urb.
Castela leonis Acuña & Roíg
Castela macrophylla Urb.
Castela peninsularis Rose
Castela polyandra Moran & Felger
Castela retusa Liebm.
Castela spinosa Cronquist
Castela stewartii (C.H.Müll.) Moran & Felger
Castela tortuosa Liebm.
Castela tweediei Planch.
Castela victorinii Acuña & Roíg

References

External links

Jepson Manual Treatment

Simaroubaceae
Sapindales genera
Dioecious plants